Federal Institute of Science And Technology (FISAT) is a private, self-financing engineering college, established and run by the Federal Bank Officers' Association Educational Society (FBOAES). It is one of the top private engineering colleges in Kerala. It is an initiative of the Federal Bank Officers' Association (FBOA), the sole representative body of the entire officers of the Federal Bank. FISAT is accredited by NBA and NAAC.

FISAT is set up at Mookannoor, near Angamaly in Ernakulam District, Kerala, the birthplace of the founder of The Federal Bank Ltd, Late K.P Hormis.

FISAT is affiliated to APJ Abdul Kalam Technological University (KTU), Mahatma Gandhi University, Kerala and approved by All India Council for Technical Education (AICTE),  New Delhi. FISAT conducts six B.Tech. courses in engineering, MBA programme (with specialization in Finance, Marketing, Human Resource Management, Information System, Production & Operations Management and International Business), MCA programme (3 years & 2 yr Lateral Entry) and six M.Tech. courses.
FISAT is accredited by NAAC with 'A' Grade

Academics 
The Federal Institute of Science And Technology (FISAT) is an engineering college approved by the All India Council for Technical Education (AICTE) and sanctioned by the government of Kerala under ISO 9001:2015 standards. The institution is affiliated to APJ Abdul Kalam Technological University for the following courses:

B.Tech. undergraduate streams:
 Civil Engineering
 Computer Science and Engineering
 Electrical and Electronics Engineering
 Electronics and Communication Engineering
Electronics and Instrumentation Engineering
 Mechanical Engineering (mechfisat.com)

Postgraduate streams:
 M. Tech in Computer Science and Information Systems
 M. Tech in Electronics Communication Engineering
 M. Tech in Power Electronics and Power Systems
 M. Tech in Computer Integrated Manufacturing
 M. Tech in Structural Engineering and Construction Management
 M. Tech in VLSI & Embedded Systems
 Master of Business Administration (MBA)
 Master of Computer Applications (MCA 2-year course)

Governance
FISAT is administered by the Federal Bank Officers' Association Educational Society, an initiative of the Federal Bank Officers' Association.

Research centres 
 FabLab In association with Kerala Start up mission and Fab Foundation Boston USA (First FabLab among the self-financing sector of Engineering colleges in Kerala). 
 Centre for High-Performance Computing (CHPC),
 Centre for Research and Innovations in Signal Processing (CRISP).
 Centre for Earthquake Engineering Studies (CEES)
 Centre for Automotive Research (CAR)
 Centre for Advanced Research in Power Converters (CARPC)
Centre for Cyber Innovation (CCI)
 Instrumentation Research and Consultancy Centre (IRACC), 
Science & technology Park And Research Centre (SPARC)

Under the Research Promotion Scheme, AICTE has sanctioned research centers in ECE, EEE, and CSE departments.

IIT Bombay has approved FISAT as one of its remote centers for implementing their project ‘Ekalavya’.

Library
An automated Library & Information Centre (LIC) is available for students, faculty, and researchers.

A programme for the development of the collection of hard copy, audio/video, CD-ROM, and other electronic forms of documents is being followed.

The college has a central library and separate reference libraries for MBA and MCA. The central library operates in a three-storeyed building where separate reference and stack rooms are provided. The libraries are fully automated with more than 62,000 volumes of textbooks and reference books in over 15,350 titles. 213 technical journals, 45 IEEE publications, and 57 magazines are subscribed to. Digital collections include more than 3000 DVDs and CD-ROMs. The Online Public Access Catalogue (OPAC) is a part of FISAT INTRANET, which enables the members to search for, reserve or check the status of any book in the library from anywhere in the world through the FISAT website. E-journal subscriptions include IEL Online, ASME, McGraw Hill-Access Engineering, Springer Link, J-Gate (JET & JSMS), ASTM Digital Library, Proquest and Elsevier-Science Direct.

Smart cards are used for library transactions. DSpace digital library helps the library users to access the digital archive. A Book Bank Scheme in which the members are issued one standard book in each subject for use in an entire semester operates.

Campus automation
The Campus Online Software Package includes modules for academics, library, administration, accounts, and store, which are integrated into a single database. A web-based service acts as an interactive tool for parents, teacher, students, and the campus administration centers for information exchange and thus links up the various departments and management functions of the college.

Arrangements for online fee payment through FedNet in collaboration with Federal Bank has been made.

Hostel facilities
Hostels for gentlemen and ladies have been provided inside the college campus. The gents' hostel can accommodate over 450 students. The ladies' hostel can accommodate 500 students. Waste disposal uses biogas and waste-water treatment.

Placement and training
All students go through soft skill enhancement training programs during their course for nearly 200 hours. There are multiple training programs spread across the whole course and focus on Life Skills, Communication, Aptitude, GD and Interview Skills. The cell has been successful in placing almost all the eligible students.

Admissions
Eligibility for admission to the B.Tech. the programme, admission policy, and procedure shall be decided from time to time by following the guidelines issued by the Government of Kerala and other statutory bodies such as KTU, AICTE etc.

50% seats of the sanctioned intake of students in B Tech courses are set apart for centralized allotment by the Commissioner for Entrance Examinations. Candidates who have passed Higher Secondary Examination, Kerala, or Examinations recognized as equivalent thereto, with 45% marks in Physics, Chemistry, and Mathematics (PCM), put together are eligible for Govt. quota admission.

15% seats of the sanctioned intake are provided for NRI category and allotted to children and dependents of NRIs on the basis of marks obtained for PCM in qualifying examination. Candidates who have passed Higher Secondary Examination, Kerala, or Examinations recognized as equivalent thereto, with 45% marks in Mathematics separately and 45% marks in Physics, Chemistry, and Mathematics (PCM), put together are eligible for NRI quota admission. These students are admitted by the Management based on their academic eligibility as per APJ Abdul Kalam Technological University norms and exempted from qualifying in Kerala Engineering Entrance Examination.

35% of the total intake is Management seats and are allotted on merit by ranking applicants on the basis of marks obtained in qualifying examination and for Kerala Engineering Entrance Examination. Candidates who have passed Higher Secondary Examination, Kerala, or Examinations recognized as equivalent thereto, with 45% marks in Physics, Chemistry, and Mathematics (PCM) put together are eligible for Management seat admission. These students are admitted by the Management based on their academic eligibility as per APJ Abdul Kalam Technological University norms.

15% Community Quota- (FBOAES) - Govt. Allotment:
Children/grandchildren of Federal Bank Officers' Association Educational Society (FBOAES) members/patrons seeking B.Tech. admission in FISAT under Govt. Community/Society Quota should enter the marks and file their options with CEE (Commissioner of Entrance Examinations) as per the schedule published in KEAM website. Then only they will be considered for allotment under FBOAES Quota.

Accreditation
CSE, ECE, ME, EEE and EIE departments are accredited by NBA. NBA accreditation is valid to June 30, 2023.

The college has also accredited by the National Assessment and Accreditation Council, (NAAC) with ‘A’ Grade (CGPA 3.06). The NAAC Peer team consisting of Prof. Tankeshwar Kumar, (vice-chancellor, Guru Jambeshwar University of Science and Technology, Haryana), Prof. B. P. Singh (former dean, Faculty of Commerce, Delhi School of Economics, University of Delhi, Delhi), Dr. Vinayak N. Shet, (principal, Goa Government Engineering College, Goa) and Dr. G. Pundarika (principal, Government Engineering College, Ramangara, Bangalore) visited the college during 29 September – 1 October 2016 for the inspection and interacted with various stakeholders. Based on the recommendation of the Peer Team, the NAAC Executive Committee met on 5 November 2016, awarded ‘A’ Grade.

Notable alumni
 Nivin Pauly, actor, producer in Malayalam Film Industry
 Sachin Warrier, playback singer and composer in the Malayalam Film Industry
 Lentin Joseph, Author, entrepreneur, electronics engineer, robotics enthusiast, machine vision expert, embedded programmer, and the founder and CEO of Qbotics Labs
 Ganesh Raj, Director Malayalam Film Industry
Sandeep Warrier, Indian International and first-class cricketer
 Dijo Jose Antony, Director, Music Composer, Actor  Malayalam Film Industry

References

Engineering colleges in Kochi
Colleges affiliated to Mahatma Gandhi University, Kerala